The Metropolitan Community Church of Edinburgh, also known as Holy Trinity Metropolitan Community Church, was the Edinburgh congregation of the Metropolitan Community Church (MCC), an international Christian denomination founded in 1968 to serve the LGBT community, from 1995 to 2009. The church has now ceased worshipping independently and has merged with Augustine United Church.

Foundation
On 17 June 1995, the first Pride Scotland March and Festival was held in Edinburgh. Reverend Jim McManus, a pastoral team member of MCC Newcastle, Reverend Roy Beaney, European District Coordinator, and other MCC members visited Edinburgh and organised a stall at the festival, followed by a small worship service in the LGBT Centre in Broughton Street.

McManus tried to use contacts made at this event to form an MCC group in Edinburgh. An article appeared in The Scotsman and Michelle Russell was interviewed on BBC Radio Scotland. At a meeting on 15 July 1995 in the LGBT Centre, the dozen or so attendees decided to form a congregation, with a first worship service taking place at the centre the following day. On 2 August 1995, during the MCC General Conference in Atlanta, Georgia, an Interim Development Group was formed, with McManus appointed as Pastor.

Development
The congregation initially worshipped in the LGBT Centre, but from October 1995 moved to larger premises in the University of Edinburgh Chaplaincy, at the invitation of the university chaplain, Reverend Iain Whyte.

Two observers were sent to the MCC's European District Conference in November 1995. The congregation adopted a constitution on 17 November 1995, establishing Holy Trinity Metropolitan Community Church, Edinburgh, as a parish extension of MCC Newcastle, with McManus elected pastor. The first church members were accepted on 16 February 1996.

In 1996, the congregation moved again to the Edinburgh Quaker Meeting House, and began meeting twice a month. In June 1996, the congregation took part in the second Pride Scotia in Glasgow. New leadership was appointed at the second annual congregational in April 1997, with the support of Reverend Doreen Shambrook representing the MCC European District.

After a development weekend in January 1998 at Scottish Churches House, the congregation agreed to hold weekly services in Augustine United Church. It merged with Augustine United Church in January 2010.

Campaigns

The church was active in several social justice campaigns, including the campaign to repeal Section 28, the campaign for same-sex marriage, and Make Poverty History. The Church gave oral evidence and lodged a Petition to the Scottish Parliament when legislation was being considered on civil partnerships in the United Kingdom, and also sought the right to constitute civil partnerships in a religious context, unsuccessfully.

In 2001, at the MCC General Conference in Toronto, Reverend Troy Perry awarded MCC Edinburgh the Founders Award for their work on social justice issues.

See also

 LGBT-welcoming church programs

References

External links
 
 Petition Lodged by the Church with the Scottish Parliament on Civil Partnerships, Scottish Parliament
 Oral Evidence given by representatives of MCC Edinburgh to the Public Petitions Committee of the Scottish Parliament on 12 May 2004, Scottish Parliament
 Gay church blasts civil partnership rights plan, Edinburgh Evening News
 Church calls for right to marry gay couples, Edinburgh Evening News
 Church appoints new Pastor, Edinburgh Evening News
 Gay church prays for gay marriage, pinknews.co.uk
 MCC Edinburgh — official website

1995 establishments in Scotland
Christian organizations established in 1995
Churches in Edinburgh
Edinburgh
LGBT churches in Scotland
LGBT culture in Edinburgh